The following is a list of characters from the anime series Vandread.

Main characters

Hibiki Tokai

 is the male protagonist, as well as a stubborn and hot head third-class citizen of Taraak that gets thrown into the mess with Duelo and Bart.  He was unwilling to do anything but hide when the Nirvana was attacked by Harvesters when they appeared halfway across the galaxy.  However, after a talk from the sub-commander, BC, Hibiki gets into a Vanguard (Bangaata), in an attempt to help the female pilots fight the enemy.  He is very rash but gets the job done, as well as often ends any enemy threat quickly.  By the end of the series, it is revealed he is the son of Lady Grand-ma and Lord Grand-pa, the empress of Mejere and emperor of Taraak, respectively, who was frozen in hibernation but awakened mysteriously around 14 years before the series began.  His uncle, Grand-pa's younger brother, whom he refers to as "grandfather," took care of him when he emerged from cryostasis.  It is also his rally to the two planets that convinces all of them that they should fight for their right to live when the Harvester fleet from Earth arrives.  During the course of the series, Hibiki and Dita have an odd-couple relationship.  In the initial episodes, Hibiki would run away from Dita every time she came after him, finding her very annoying.  He even screamed at her, getting her to leave him alone, for which he indirectly apologizes to her later. Eventually, Hibiki gets used to being around Dita, often helping her out on board the Nirvana. He also falls in love with Dita's cooking and eventually with Dita herself. As the series progresses he grows more mature, having his own existence recognized by the other members of Nirvana, becoming a more strong pilot and person.

As the story progresses he shows that he developed fondness for the crew, as the apparent loss of Gascogne deals him a major blow to his morale as shown after the battle where he goes to Gascogne's place and mourns her silently. He also cares for the well being of any close to him, which he showed when he let Misty clean his Vanguard so she no longer feels alone. At the end of the Second Stage he shows that his fondness of the pirates crew has grown so far that he is more than willing to risk his life in attempting to prevent the wormhole to fully form using his own vanguard (and body) as a shield with a broken left arm, stating that even if he is going to die there he will always live in the hearts of the crew with a confident face, showing courage and resolve beyond measure.

He has a very keen instinct for planning and tactics as he is the one who do most (if not all) of them, which he uses in all sorts of scenarios, from turning a gas planet into a star to crush the Harvest fleet and the bring down their flagship, to helping the crew set a surprise birthday party for Meia (she tries her best to thwart it because she hates being the main focus of attention), even turning her into Karu's caretaker to prevent her from complaining to Magno.

The crew on board the Nirvana sees the romantic feelings developing between Hibiki and Dita, often wondering when the two will admit their feelings for each other.  The crew wants to see a romance story unfold, as well as to know if it's at all possible for a man and woman to be that close.

The series also features Hibiki's relationships with the other girls which range all the way from sisterly to obsessive.

In the manga, his relationship with Dita is much more romantic and he reciprocates Dita's feelings faster and even kisses her (which is something that never happens in the anime). Since Dita doesn't refer him as "Mr. Alien" but his name, he also call her by her name frequently (where in the anime he very rarely called out her name). The budding romance between Hibiki and Dita form the main plot of the manga.

In the Vandread Extra Stage Novel, it is revealed that after the end of the series, Hibiki and Dita get married and have a baby.

Dita Liebely

 is the female protagonist who is romantically involved with Hibiki. Dita has a bubbly, lively personality that usually shows in almost every aspect of life, even when she is fighting (she refers to the enemy as "bad aliens"). She admits to having feelings for Hibiki since she met him in the first episode (whether or not this was a love at first sight moment is debatable) and is subject to at least some ridicule and incredulity by her fellow crew members for her unusual infatuation with a male. She mentions that it was always her childhood fantasy that "Someday, aliens would come and take us in their spaceship to a land of happiness", a variation of the "Someday, my prince will come" fantasy of women (which is impressive as Dita was raised in an all-female culture that saw males as a different species of hostile aliens) .

When her Dread unites with Hibiki's Vanguard, they become the Vandread Dita-type Blue Kachina/Giant[Kachina literally means life bringer], a blue giant mecha that has access to two powerful dual energy cannons, that acts as long-range or short-range weapons. She loves cooking for Hibiki and feels satisfied whenever he wolfs down her delicacies. While her character is childish, she received a co-leading rank, just under Jura and Barnett.

As the series progresses its shown that Dita always remains cheerful as a token of gratitude to others that always disregarded her clumsy ways at her home colony and displayed affection to her instead. Also she truly cares for the people she loves, being the one who cheers the whole crew at least at the two major events of the Nirvana (The first Flagship they destroyed and facing the Planet Destroyer Ship at the second season finale) boosting the withered morale of all rekindling their battle spirits. Hibiki has a very special place in her heart from very early in the series, and is willing to put herself in danger in the last battle just to protect him, stating that she may be an idiot not good at complex things but that she is willing to protect all the ones she loves pushing her Dread through a barrier to fuse with Hibiki even risking the implosion of her Dread. In the moments of greatest peril she have displayed courage beyond measure despite she usually shows nervousness when the enemies does something weird or unexpected.

While initially a bit hostile and jealous of Misty and her attitude towards Hibiki she ends getting close to her after Ezra points that Misty has no one in the whole universe (as most likely her parents at Pluto are dead) she displays that her heart has no room for ill feelings and soon she tries to bond with Misty as well, even offering a place on her room at the colony when the get back to Mejere; while Misty at first shows that she is annoyed she quickly drops that facade  and accepts Dita's feelings warmly thus erasing most of the loneliness within her. She later returns the favor and reassures Dita when they return to Mejere and are prosecuted disregarding the pirates story, showing that she now loves her (in a non romantic fashion) too.

In the manga, Dita is more mature and addresses Hibiki by name rather than "Mr. Alien". Her feelings for him are also more romantic and he reciprocates them just as quickly. The budding romance between Dita and Hibiki form the main plot of the manga.

In the Vandread Extra Stage Novel, it is revealed that after the end of the series, Hibiki and Dita get married and have a baby.

Meia Gisborn

, at first, has the behavior of an Amazon: she detests men and is disgusted whenever Hibiki saves her. She rarely smiles (only doing so a few times on cacamiel the first season and the second season (Second Stage), including the time she smiled when she had to babysit Ezra's baby, Karu, as well as during the final fight with the enemy). She suffers from  claustrophobia and has a traumatic past. As a young girl, the life support systems on her home quadrant failed, a new system that her "Ohma" (Woman-Father) had personally designed, thus there was a system-wide failure that forced a sudden mass evacuation.  She lost her mother when she pushed her aboard the last ship off the quadrant amongst the crowds trying to get on. Alone, she resorted to a life of crime and street fights to make a living, due to the insecurity she felt from people blaming her parents for the catastrophe, as well as slowly losing the will to live. She often holds a sample marked "A6" close to her which is presumably a research sample from her mother's work.

She joined the pirates when Magno Vivian appeared and tossed a laser ring to her, telling her if she wanted to die so badly, she can try dying doing something cool.  With a new will to live, she gained ranks quickly.  As squadron commander, she leads the other Dreads in battle and is usually called "Leader" or "Chief" by others.  Despite her stoic and strict nature, everyone looks up to and appreciates Meia and normally tries to throw a surprise birthday party for her. However, she despises such occasions and once she flew off in her Dread to scout ahead of the Nirvana, just so that she would not be irritated by the crew, the next time however, under Hibiki leadership, the crew manages to finally get her to a 'surprise' birthday party. Despite her initial hatred for men, she ends up respecting Hibiki for his strong spirit, even noticing their similarities: they are both trying to prove their own existence. As the series progresses she also learns how to express her true feelings, realizing that the love that her Mother and Ohma had for her was strong, as well as she should pass it forward.

When her Dread unites with Hibiki's Vanguard, they become the Vandread Meia-type – the incredibly high-speed White Wing, which resembles a silver eagle. Its main, as well as only known, form of attack is a high-velocity ram that pierces nearly all enemy units in its path.

In the manga, Meia is the acting captain of the Nirvana.

Jura Basil Elden

 is the secondary leader of the Dread fighting force, although she is somewhat inexperienced in a leadership role and not as skilled as Meia because Meia refuses to allow Jura to gain experience. The reasons behind this are due to her spoiled personality, vanity and her dependency to Barnette. Initially, she keeps trying to unite with Hibiki's Vanguard, after seeing how Dita and Meia were able to accomplish this. Jura usually carries a rapier, but seldom gets the chance to show her ability with it.

She is initially shocked at the appearance of her Vandread Jura-type Red Claw, which resembles a red crab when she first unites with Hibiki's Vanguard. It resembles a crab with green discs that orbit the machine. This particular Vandread utilizes an enhanced shielding system, which allows it to cover any object, up to the size of a planet, making it more of a defensive weapon than an offensive one. In Second Stage, she spends a lot of time trying to get Hibiki to make a baby with her, as well as when he is leaving, she makes a dive for him, misses and grabs Duelo instead.

After Gasco apparent death she becomes way more mature and sharp at leadership role, showing a growth in her personality.

Its showed that Jura and Barnette are extremely close to each other thus hinting some kind of relationship between both of them; whether is very deep friendship or romantic love is not clearly stated.

In the manga, Jura is a bridge operator instead of a Dread pilot, as well as possessing a hatred for men.

Supporting female characters

Misty Cornwell

 is a new female character rescued by the crew at the beginning of the Second Stage. Found inside a human-sized pod who was rescued after a short scuffle between the Nirvana and several Harvester units, Misty is from the planet Pluto, in the same solar system as the planet Earth is located. As such, she is well-knowledged in the old-fashioned ideals about men and women, such as the typical boyfriend/girlfriend relationship, which confuses the others and makes Dita feel jealous.

Like Dita, Misty is an excellent cook and uses her knowledge of men along with that to her advantage. Though she later gives up on trying to win Hibiki's heart, she does allow Dita to realize her own affections for Hibiki. Meanwhile she turns her attentions towards Meia after she approaches Misty to deliver some comfort after Misty understands that Hibiki is already in love with Dita (despite Hibiki not fully understanding this), seeing her as a big sister to suffice her loneliness, which helps her into making part of the crew. A bit later on the series Dita also offers Misty her friendship and she happily accepts it after a short facade of being annoyed of Dita's offer.

She is sometimes seen with a blob-like creature named Q-chan hovering on her left shoulder, which form changes depending on Misty's current state of spirit.

Misty does not appear in the manga.

Barnette Orangello

 is one of the many Dread pilot co-leaders under Meia's command of the Nirvana. She is ranked higher than Dita. Unlike the three other Dread pilots featured in the series (Dita, Meia, and Jura), her Dread cannot combine with Hibiki's Vanguard, due to her position when the Paxis altered the Dreads. She displays one of the most aggressive behaviors, in terms of both her fighting style and her attitude towards men, who have been integrated into the Nirvana's crew (probably more than Meia). This animosity against men reach a breaking point and she ends up leading a riot and jailing the male crew as they did at the start of the series, she also disdains Duero's medical help but she is forced to submit after he points that if she refuses treatment her condition will worsens and she will be unable to fight. Her animosity against men is left behind and never shown again after she took the position of the Registry Chief.

She has a very impressive firearms collection (including a Calico Pistol, a CZ 75 pistol, a Steyr AUG, and a Franchi SPAS-12 shotgun)and is an excellent cook.

Barnette tends to display an impulsive and reckless attitude when she gets angry even reaching the point to attempt a suicidal attack on the first enemy Harvester Flagship, this outbursts tends to be keep at check by the cool-headed Registry Chief Gascogne; the relationship among the two tends to be tense (from Barnette's side) but eventually she drops her aggressive attitude and acts way more relaxed with the chief. During the Second Stage, she voluntarily replaced Gascogne to lead the Registry after her apparent death  in a sortie against a Harvester flagship. She becomes a much more kind person, trying to carry both the job and attitude of Gascogne, being much more supportive of all the crew. Hibiki and her develop some kind of friendship when he unconsciously wanders into the Registry after a quarrel involving Ditta as he tended to do when Gascone was (assumed to be dead at that moment) alive, he excuses himself and attempts to leave but Barnette stops him, stating that, while she doesn't know how to play poker she is not that bad listening to other people, thus granting him solace and advice.

In the last battle, after Gascogne shows up alive, she resigns her post as Registry Chief and resumes her post as pilot, thanking Gascogne for being alive, while the later telling her to go out "and kick some ass".

She is very close to Jura, showing some kind of romantic feelings from her side displayed that when Jura wanted to have a baby Barnette showed that she wouldn't mind being the partner for that.

In the manga, Barnette has feelings for Hibiki.

Buzam A. Calessa

, or simply "BC", is the sub-commander of the Nirvana. She is stern and all-business and looks after the general welfare of the crew. A skilled tactician, BC gives orders firmly and decisively.  She seems like a workaholic, constantly staying near the bridge to access data and review the crew's performance.  During the initial episodes, she is seen secretly taking a small, data disc from the bridge's database, until Magno interrupts.  However, her suspicious actions do not seem relevant until the Second Stage, where it is revealed that she is actually the Commander of the Taraak Intelligence, whose old name is Tenmei Uragasumi, a male spy for Taraak who was submitted to a complete sex change, as well as simulates a woman voice through a small device on her necklace. However, the experiences she had with the crew and the bond she created with Magno kept her loyal to the Nirvana members. In the end, Magno Vivan forgives her and retains her position as sub-commander, on the provision that she stays as BC.

Bart makes many attempts to declare to her, and while she turns him down most of the time in the last time, when he is held prisoner on a torture chamber at Tarak he keeps that he loved her when she was a female (despite she is still a woman as her sex change hasn't been reversed) and he doesn't care her gender, she seems to have started to develop some kind of feelings for him, hinted by her somewhat small smile when Bart groans of pain on his arms in the last battle calling him 'weakling' with a rather tender expression.

In the manga, BC is a cis woman and a villain. She is referred by others as Buzam rather than BC.

Parfet Balblair

 is the ship's chief engineer.  She's a cheerful, nerdy-looking girl with huge glasses and brown hair which she keeps in two large pigtails.  Parfait spends most of her time monitoring the Paeksys and the ship's engines, but also has time to devise other inventions for the crew on special occasions. At Christmas she worked very hard to get a snow machine working for everyone. From the start of the series, she finds herself partnered with Duelo, the two having a common patient. As the series progresses, the two become very close, as well as by the end seem to have a mutual attraction (she became very jealous when Jura made a dive for Hibiki, missed and ended up grabbing Duelo instead).

Paiway Underberg

 is the ship's nurse under Duelo, though her uniform looks more like a French maid's outfit than a nurse's.  Prior to the appearance of the men she was the ship's only doctor, though she seems to be younger than most (if not the most) of the crew.  During the first season, she spent her free time trying to exploit the bad habits of the male crew members and would secretly keep tabs on the men and either jot down notes in her journal or take pictures with her camera, which she refers to as "Pai-checks."  This would soon pay off and sparked a raid that got all the men, including the drifter Rabat, locked up for a while before they were released.  However, she stops this after a combination of seeing Dita's reaction to Hibiki's imprisonment and the discovery that men and women were of the same species before there release, but she resumes her activities anyway.  She carries a frog hand puppet (which is also her purse) with her all the time and is often seen talking to people with it in a gruff low pitched voice. (In the Japanese version, she talks to people with it in a more childish voice, ending her sentences through the frog puppet with the term "kero," which is the Japanese equivalent of "ribbit.)  She is usually either seen with Duelo or spying on everyone. At the end of Second Stage (season 2) she gave in to impulse and flicked Duelo's hair up to see his face and apparently thought him rather handsome.

Paiway does not appear in the manga.

Magno Vivan

 is the commander of the pirates and everyone addresses her Boss (Okashira in the Japanese version, which was translated as "captain"). She is one of the first-generation colonists from Earth that was on board the Ikazuchi colony ship, hoping to populate other planets around the galaxy.  She is over a hundred years old and is filled to the brim with knowledge and wisdom, most of which reflects the same kind of wisdom that can be applied to both genders, before their separation into Mejare and Taraak.  She often hands out pieces of advice and directs the crew in their duties.

She sees her crew as her children and she hold them in high esteem, also she hold a picture of any of the crew who have left/died displayed when Gascogne apparently dies and she places her picture inside the cabinet.

Also, though not directly stated, she may be Hibiki Tokai's sister. This can be derived from the picture she has of herself on the colonization ship holding the infant Hibiki. However, it can be argued that this may not be true, as stated by Hibiki's "grandfather" (in reality, he is his uncle) during a conversion near the end of the Second Stage, that he remembers Magno always coming to play with the infant Hibiki on the colony ship. As such, she may merely be an age-old friend of his, during her days as a youth.

Gascogne Rheingau

 runs the Nirvana's Registry and is responsible for supplying the Dread fighters with all of their weapons for their battles against the Harvesters, either inside the ship or outside, while piloting a delivery vessel. While her Registry crew might lose their heads among the excitement and intensity of the battles, she is always able to help them maintain their cool by reminding them to "Smile!" On top of her duties as the head of Registry, she is Magno's third-in command, after BC. She is very much like a big sister to the rest of the crew and is there to give sarcastic advise whatever it is needed (although sometimes not appreciated). During her spare time, or whenever there are no Harvester encounters, she enjoys playing a round of Poker with Hibiki. She seemingly despises being called "Gasco". Gascogne acts like a big sister to Hibiki, giving him advise, as well as spending their free tie together.

 In The Second Stage, the Nirvana was caught in a seemingly impossible battle against a Harvester mothership. In an attempt to save Barnette's Dread from being crushed by a Copy-Nirvana, Gascogne, in the delivery ship, flies in and shoot missiles at the unit. Although Barnette was jarred loose from the impact, the copy turns it's rage onto Gascogne and impaled the ship. As it fell into the mothership and burst into flames, the delivery ship is swallowed up and Gascogne is unable to escape. It is assumed that she did not survive the crash. However, she shows up very much alive, during the final battle against Earth, piloting the same mothership, after commandeering it's systems.

Gascogne does not appear in the manga.

Ezra Vieil

 is a part of the bridge crew of the Nirvana and she is an operator, although most of her work appears to surround communications.  Ezra is kind, soft and cheerful, as well as always seems to be able to cheer people up with her kindness. Despite the animosity between women and men, Ezra has become a kind motherly figure to Dita and Hibiki and tends to give advice to both. She also agreed to be a "Fama" and is pregnant throughout much of the first series, displaying symptoms(in which she wanted to eat most of the time and in one episode she had a craving for something sour)that seem to be a mystery to the men on the Nirvana.
 
Ezra's kindness is repaid to her when she has her baby, as the crew all help her through bringing her child into the world.  Although it is difficult for her at times to be a mother, Ezra tries her best in order to care for the baby and make sure that her "Ohma" Rebecca is proud of her.

Ezra does not appear in the manga.

Supporting male characters

Duelo McFile

 is the ship doctor for the Nirvana.  Duelo quickly takes over medical emergencies often at the objection of the female pirates, but ignores them, assuring the crew members that he is not a threat.  Since he is the only licensed medical practitioner on board the Nirvana, as well as being that the medical facilities on board the female pirate ship were no longer operational, the female pirates were left with no choice but to have him as their official doctor.  A very calm and collected character, it was said that Duelo got whatever job he wanted simply by submitting a blank resume with his name on it, as he was one of Taraak's elite.  However, he can be confused and awkward when faced with something outside of his experience and education, as when he had to coach Hibiki and Dita through delivery of Ezra's baby.  While very analytical, he also makes an important discovery during the series regarding Hibiki's heritage.  He eventually becomes close friends with Parfait, the first woman he worked closely with, which later develops into a mutual attraction.  He fits the anime classification of a bishōnen, randomly acts yaoi-like and never shows the right side of his face. The latter trait is explicitly referenced at the very end of the Second Stage, when Paiway Underberg sneaks up to Duelo and for a second, strokes aside the hair covering his right eye. She then contentedly exclaims "Just as I thought!" but because the audience only sees Duelo's back at that moment, what she saw exactly remains a mystery (judging by the rather pleased faces both Paiway and Parfait had, he is probably handsome).

Duelo does not appear in the manga.

Bart Garsus

 is a first-class citizen from Taraak, coming from rich parents who owned a food production company.  He is initially an easily excitable, weak, as well as cowardly character, who ends up becoming the helmsman of the Nirvana when the ship chose him for the job.  He usually liked to run away from any difficulty presented to him and made a fuss every time he was injured, while on the cockpit he is fully naked and feels any damage to the ship as if it was hit himself.
Early in Vandread: The Second Stage, Bart showed compassion for a terminally ill little girl on a planet polluted by the Earth as an experiment.  She listened to his embellished stories and laughed at his jokes.  When a Harvest ship reached the planet to reclaim the corpses of the planet as part of the experiment, he showed courage and resolve on another's behalf for the first time by fighting the ships off almost single handedly with the Nirvana after by sheer will and anger he made the Nirvana to develop a weapon system.  But while he was gone, she died from her illness.  She left a doll of Bart she was making, without finishing the hair. In her memory, Bart shaved his head, closely bringing his appearance to that of the unfinished doll and hung it around his neck like a pendant, as a constant reminder of her.  
Towards the end of the series, he develops feelings for BC, not knowing her secret, but even after he finds out, he is not swayed and continues to pursue BC for a relationship .  While more settled late in the series, Bart remains a comic relief character, although he matures a little as the series progresses, even contributing for the successive transformations of Nirvana.

Bart appears for a brief moment in the manga, but does not join the Nirvana.

Recurring characters in the anime

Rabat

 is an intergalactic trader. Although he is a swindler and con-artist, he has some vital information as to what exactly the enemies are that the Nirvana are up against. He is accompanied by a female orangutan called Butan.

From his first introduction in the series, the crew meets Rabat and his ape sidekick on a deserted space station. He cajoles his way aboard the Nirvana, as well as secretly tries to swindle the crew and steal Hibiki's Vanguard. Afterwards, when confronted by Hibiki, he scolds Hikibi on the ethics of manhood by beating him to a pulp, though this did play part in Hibiki's development. After being found out, he departs from the ship but later has another run in with the Nirvana after saving Hibiki. Afterwards, he resurfaces when the Nirvana docks in a facility of Harvester refugees whose leader has a long infatuation for him. Later in the series, it is revealed that he earned money for his own survival as an informant for the Harvest fleet.

However, there was another dimension to his character as well. Rabat was originally a space explorer from Earth, as well as that his real name is Samuel Adams. He crashed on a planet that had inhabitants that could only speak through telepathy and not words. Rabat was taken in by their culture and eventually learned their ways, that the "spirits" would choose someone to lead the victory over the Harvest fleet. That person was Hibiki, and not Rabat - and so Rabat set out in search of the one chosen by the spirits. His profession as a merchant and his association with the Harvest fleet is perhaps only a cover for this. His bad treatment of Hibiki was only a way of teaching him to overcome himself, as well as prove that he existed by using words that were his own, and not others, displayed when shows that he is pleased Hibiki successfully overcame the warrior trial on the planet where people got their voices ripped off by the earthlings. Towards the ending of the series, he later helps the Nirvana in the final battle against the Harvesters commanding a cojoined force of the refugees of the first facility and the mute people, being the first to answer Hibiki's after the secondary pirate crew joins the Nirvana.

Rabat does not appear in the manga.

Butan

 is an orangutan who is with Rabat all the time. She likes Pyoro a lot but doesn't like Rabat being close to any women he likes.

Butan does not appear in the manga.

Pyoro

 is a small robot who was originally a navigation robot (NAVI robot) on board the original colony ship Ikazuchi.  When Hibiki is caught on board the upgraded Ikazuchi, the NAVI robot is assigned to guard Hibiki, who's imprisoned behind an electronic barrier.  However, when the pirates from Mejere attack and the original section of the Ikazuchi is jettisoned (where Hibiki's cell is located), the attack by Taraak to destroy that jettisoned section combined with the Paksis Pragma's attempt to save itself caused the NAVI robot to become broken.  Thus the Paksis causes it to evolve and have a personality along with a quirky speech pattern in which the robot ends most of its sentences with the term "pyoro."  After the Mejere pirate ship is merged with the old Ikazuchi to become the Nirvana, the ship's chief engineer decides to name the old NAVI robot, "Pyoro-kun" (or just Pyoro as it is done in the English) after hearing it speak. He is integral in the formation of Super Vandread--Dita's, Meia's and Jura's Dreads, Hibiki's Vanguard and Pyoro himself combined.

Pyoro does not appear in the manga.

Amarone Slaintheav

 is a dark-skinned Megeran who is an operator of the Nirvana.

Belvedere Coco

 is a blond-haired Megeran who is also an operator.

Celtic Midori

 is another Megeran operator who has all sorts of costumes. She's mostly a cosplay person of the crew. She initially wears a full body teddy bear costume as a way to conceal her body from the men on board and later is one of the leaders who imprison Hibiki, Duelo and Bart. She comes around as the male and female relations improve by cutting the face out of her teddy bear costume. During the Second Stage, she's seen using a different costume on each episode, she is not seen wearing the operator clothes until the last battle.

Recurring characters in the manga

Tenhou Farland

 is a smart young girl from Megeran and is Paiway's manga replacement. She is especially nice to Hibiki who she looks upon him like a brother. She has the ability to communicate with machines. Tenhou was an orphan when she was found by Meia. Meia then takes her to the Megeran Pirates, who Tenhou joins. She has a thing for teddy bears.

Tenhou seems to have the characteristics of Paiway, Ezra and Pyoro. She is almost the same size with Paiway and often likes to explains details of many things, she is also very kind and is capable of fusing her mind with the Paksis.

Tenhou does not appear in the anime.

Asra Mutie

 is the pilot of Vandora. She first appear to help the Nirvana crew only to get information from them of who they are. She hangs out with Hibiki which makes Dita sad to see Hibiki with her. She then got her mind controlled and started to attack Hibiki. Dita then arrived just in time to see what was happening and tried to save Hibiki. Tenhou then appeared to stop Asra, but took off and is shanghaied by her Vandora. Hibiki and Dita piloted Vandread and fought Vandora. They managed to destroy Vandora and save Asra. Meia decided to have Asra as a new crew member seeing how she is a hybrid and Hibiki is a Taraak. Jura has Asra to be a clean up girl to act as one of the crew members.

Asra seems to have the characteristics of Misty and Gascogne (who both don't appear in the manga): she ties her blue hair in a ponytail and flirts with Hibiki, much to Dita's dismay. She is also seen playing poker with Hibiki--and winning! Also, as an interesting note, unlike real humans, she has pointed ears much like an elf's.

Asra does not appear in the anime.

References

Vandread
Vandread
Vandread